Mescinia commatella is a species of snout moth in the genus Mescinia. It was described by Zeller in 1881. It is found in Colombia.

References

Moths described in 1881
Phycitinae